Austin Coates (1922–1997) was a British civil servant, writer and traveller. He was the son of noted English composer Eric Coates.

Austin Coates wrote extensively on topics related to the Asia-Pacific region, particularly Hong Kong and Macau. He was first connected to the East through his service for the Royal Air Force intelligence in India, Burma, Malaysia and Indonesia in the Second World War. After the war, he worked for the Hong Kong government as Assistant Colonial Secretary and Magistrate in the New Territories from 1949 to 1956. As a magistrate, he gained insight on the Chinese customs and character, and he applied Chinese laws to solve many of his cases.

After Hong Kong, he was the Chinese Affairs Officer in Sarawak from 1957 to 1959; First Secretary of the British High Commission, Kuala Lumpur and Penang from 1959 to 1962. In 1962, he left the British civil service to concentrate on writing. In 1965, he settled in Hong Kong and continued travelling and writing extensively. In 1968, he published Rizal: Philippine Nationalist and Martyr, a biography of the Philippine national hero José Rizal which serves as the second biographical account of the life and career of Rizal authored by a non-Filipino. 

Coates was the guest of many prominent Asians, among them the Tagore family, the Indian painter Jamini Roy and Mahatma Gandhi. After his visit with Gandhi, he decided that understanding between East and West was one of the most important goals in the world.

His book, City of Broken Promises was made into an extremely successful musical for the Hong Kong Art Festival in 1978.  The show was also staged in San Jose in 1979, starring Teresa Carpio.
 
Coates was cremated at Golders Green Crematorium.

Bibliography

Travel and history
 Invitation to an Eastern Feast (1953)
 Personal and Oriental (1957)
 Basutoland (Corona Library, 1966)
 Western Pacific Islands (The Corona Library, 1970)
 Islands of the South (1974)

History
 Portuguese Roots in Africa (1965) Johannesburg: Frier & Munro
 Prelude to Hong Kong (1966) London: Routledge and Kegan Paul; second edition as Macao and the British, 1637–1842 Hong Kong: Oxford University Press, 1988, 234 pp;
 Rizal, Philippine Nationalist and Martyr (1968), Oxford University Press. José Rizal is the national hero of the Philippines.
  China, India and the Ruins of Washington (1972) New York: John Day, discusses the longevity of the Chinese and Indian civilisations in contrast to the Western civilisation.
 A Mountain of Light: The Story of the Hongkong Electric Company (1977)
 A Macao Narrative (1978) Hong Kong, Oxford University Press, 2nd edition 1999, 146 pp., preface by Cesar Guillen-Nunez
 Whampoa: Ships on the Shore (Hong Kong: SCMP. 1980), about the founding of the Hongkong & Whampoa Dock Company and the transformation of Hong Kong from a sleepy little village to the seventh biggest port of the world.
 China Races (1984) Oxford University Press (China), a history of racing on the China Coast commissioned by the Royal Hong Kong Jockey Club.
 Quick Tidings of Hong Kong  (Hong Kong: Oxford University Press. 1990 A History of telecommunications in Hong Kong.
 The Commerce in Rubber: The First 250 Years (1987) Singapore: Oxford University Press

Other non-fiction
 Report on the Southern District (195?) Rural development, Village communities, Southern District New Territories 
 Myself a Mandarin (1968) London: Frederick Muller, describes the author's experience as a special magistrate in the New Territories.
 Numerology (1975)  Coates explains his system of reading people's characters and predicting their fortunes based on their names and birth dates.

Novels
 The Road (London: Hutchinson & Co, 1957), novel about Hong Kong's Lantau Island during 20th century. 
 City of Broken Promises (1959, Hong Kong, Oxford University Press, 2nd edition 1987, 314 pp.  A novel based on the life of Martha Merop, a Chinese orphan in Macao who rose to great success in business and on her liaison with Thomas Kuyck van Mierop, a principal of the British East India Company.)

References

20th-century British writers
1922 births
1997 deaths
British diplomats in East Asia
Royal Air Force personnel of World War II